Néma-Badenyakafo  is a rural commune of the Cercle of Djenné in the Mopti Region of Mali. The commune contains 29 villages. The principal village (chef-lieu) is Mougna.

References

External links
.

Communes of Mopti Region